Yin Yezi (born 25 June 1991) is a Chinese actress.

Yin is noted for her roles as Xue Baoqin and Zhao Meiran in the television series The Dream of Red Mansions (2010) and Meteor Shower (2009) respectively.

Life
Yin was born in Wuhan, Hubei on June 25, 1991. Yin secondary studied at Wuhan Song and Dance Theatre, and she graduated from Central Academy of Drama.

Yin made her acting debut in Life of True Love, playing Jin Ling.

Yin had a cameo appearance in Meteor Shower (2009), a romantic comedy television series adaptation based on Japanese manga Hana Yori Dango. That same year, she made her film debut in Flirting Scholar 2, playing Bao Xiang, a film starring Huang Xiaoming, Zhang Jingchu, Natalis Chan, Richie Ren and Zhou Libo.

In 2010, Yin co-starred with Jiang Mengjie, Yao Di and Michelle Bai in the historical television series The Dream of Red Mansions as Xue Baoqin.

In 2011, Yin starred in a television series called National Defense Students with Zhang Shanqi and Gao Ziqi.

In 2012, Yin starred in the romantic comedy television series Treasure Mother Treasure Girl, she received mixed reviews.

In 2013, Yin starred in two television series, The Lure of Cloud and Love Is Not For Sale.

In 2014, Yin starred in the ancient costume comedy The Investiture of the Gods, adapted from Xu Zhonglin's classical novel of the same title.

Works

Film

Television

References

External links

1991 births
Central Academy of Drama alumni
Living people
21st-century Chinese actresses
Actresses from Wuhan
Chinese film actresses
Chinese television actresses